Mohammad N. Faqiri may refer to:
Mohammad Nasim Faqiri (born 1958), a former anti-Soviet fighter, diplomat, senior official in the Jamiat-e-Islami party, and Taliban supporter
Mohammad Nazar Faqiri (born 1955), a former refugee, refugee camp director, appointed to the Meshrano Jirga in 2005